Madeline Bell (born c. 1962) is an American nurse and hospital administrator. She is the president and CEO of the Children's Hospital of Philadelphia (CHOP).

Education 
Bell is a native of Delaware County, Pennsylvania.  Bell graduated from Villanova University with a bachelor of science degree in Nursing in 1983, and holds an honorary doctorate in human letters from Villanova. She earned a master of science degree in Organizational Dynamics from the University of Pennsylvania.

Career 

Bell began her career as a pediatric night nurse at CHOP in 1983. She left CHOP to pursue a career in hospital administration. She returned to CHOP in 1995.

Bell has held the roles of Vice President, Senior Vice President, and Executive Vice President at CHOP. She was Chief Operating Officer at CHOP for eight years. She was named President and CEO of the hospital in 2015. During her leadership, CHOP has been one of the most profitable children's health systems in the United States, and one of her priorities has been the expansion of its facilities.

In 2016, Bell joined Comcast's Board of Directors, and is the second woman to hold this role. She is Deputy Chair of the Federal Reserve Bank of Philadelphia’s Board of Directors. She is also a fellow of the Philadelphia College of Physicians, and has served on local leadership boards, including The Philadelphia Regional Recharge and Recovery Taskforce formed in 2020 to support economic development in Philadelphia.

Bell maintains a blog titled Heels of Success and hosts the podcast, Breaking Through with Madeline Bell. In 2020, she broadcast a five-part series on her podcast titled "Where Are We Now", focused on COVID-19 and CHOP doctors and researchers.

Awards and recognition 
 Industry Icon Award, Philadelphia Inquirer
 Most Admired CEO Award, Philadelphia Business Journal
 100 Most Influential People in Healthcare, Modern Healthcare (2017, 2018 and 2019)
 Most Influential Corporate Directors, WomenInc. (2018)
 Top 25 Women Leaders, Modern Healthcare (2019)

References 

Year of birth missing (living people)
Living people
Wharton School of the University of Pennsylvania alumni
Villanova University alumni
21st-century American businesswomen
21st-century American businesspeople
American hospital administrators
American women nurses
American health care chief executives
Businesspeople from Pennsylvania
People from Delaware County, Pennsylvania